Brockerhoff Mill, also known as Roopsburg Mill, is a historic grist mill located at Benner Township, Centre County, Pennsylvania.  It was built about 1862, and is a four-story brick building on a limestone foundation.  It measures 56 feet by 40 feet, and has a gable roof.  Also on the property are the remains of the mill race.  The mill was built by Henry Brockerhoff (1794-1878), who also built the Brockerhoff Hotel.

It was added to the National Register of Historic Places in 1979.

References

Grinding mills on the National Register of Historic Places in Pennsylvania
Industrial buildings completed in 1862
Buildings and structures in Centre County, Pennsylvania
Grinding mills in Pennsylvania
1862 establishments in Pennsylvania
National Register of Historic Places in Centre County, Pennsylvania